Joie d'être gai is the fifth studio album by Québécois Pop rock band Les Trois Accords released November 20, 2015. The album was recorded in New York City.

Track listing 
 "Joie d'être gai" - 4:12
 "Dans le coin" - 3:04
 "J'épile ton nom" - 3:25
 "Les dauphins et les licornes" - 5:15
 "St-Bruno (Nuit de la poésie )" - 4:29
 "Top bronzés" - 3:18
 "J'ai un massage pour toi" - 2:39
 "Non, toi raccroche" - 3:25
 "L'esthéticienne" - 3:30
 "C'est pas facial" - 3:02

References 

2015 albums
Les Trois Accords albums